Zygia cognata is a tree species in the legume family (Fabaceae). It is found in Belize, Guatemala, and Honduras.

Junior synonyms are:

 Feuilleea cognata (Schltdl.) Kuntze
 Inga cognata Schltdl.
 Inga stevensonii Standl.
 Pithecellobium cognatum (Schltdl.) Benth.
 Pithecellobium stevensonii (Standl.) Standl. & Steyerm.
 Pithecolobium cognatum (Schltdl.) Benth. (lapsus)
 Pithecolobium stevensonii (Standl.) Standl. & Steyerm. (lapsus)
 Zygia stevensonii (Standl.) Record

Footnotes

References
  (2005): Zygia cognata. Version 10.01, November 2005. Retrieved 2008-MAR-30.
 

cognata
Trees of Belize
Trees of Guatemala
Trees of Honduras
Endangered plants
Taxonomy articles created by Polbot